Fauquier-Strickland ( or ) is a township municipality in Cochrane District in Northeastern Ontario, Canada. The three main communities in the township are Fauquier, Strickland, and Gregoires Mill. All are located along Ontario Highway 11 between the community of Departure Lake to the east and the municipality of Moonbeam to the west.

The municipality was incorporated on December 24, 1921, as Shackleton and Machin, the names of the two geographic townships that then comprised its territory. It adopted its current name in 1984, renaming itself for its two largest communities. , it includes the two original geographic townships; to the south the eastern half of geographic Macvicar Township, the western half of geographic Carmichael Township, and all of geographic Stringer Township; to the east, the western portion of geographic Haggart Township; and to the north, all of geographic Beardmore Township. Ironically, geographic Fauquier Township is adjacent to the west and is part of the municipality of Moonbeam.

Fauquier is located along the Groundhog River. The main community landmark is a roadside statue of a groundhog.

Reeves

 Pierre Guèvremont (1922–1929)
 J. Anaclet Habel (1930–1931)
 Ph. Filion (1932)
 Napoléon Gravel (1933–1945)
 J. Émile Jacques (1946–1948)
 Raoul Tremblay (1949–1955)
 J. Antoine Laferrière (1956–1964, 1969–1972)
 Edmond Gauthier (1965)
 Laurent Dufour (1966–1968)
 Raymond Grzela (1972–2003)
 Jacques Demers (2003–2006)
 Madeleine Tremblay (2006–present)

Demographics 

Population:
 Population in 2016: 536 
 Population in 2011: 530
 Population in 2006: 568
 Population in 2001: 678
 Population in 1996: 684 (or 747 when adjusted to 2001 boundaries)
 Population in 1991: 746

Mother tongue:
 English as first language: 25.23%
 French as first language: 71.96%
 English and French as first language: 0.95%
 English and Other as first language: 0.95
 Other as first language: 0.95%

See also
List of townships in Ontario
List of francophone communities in ontario

References

External links
 

Municipalities in Cochrane District
Single-tier municipalities in Ontario
Township municipalities in Ontario